Traventhal is a municipality in the district of Segeberg, in Schleswig-Holstein, Germany. It gave name to the Peace of Travendal treaty signed there in 1700.

References

Municipalities in Schleswig-Holstein
Segeberg